The 1950 National League Division One was the 16th season of speedway in the United Kingdom and the fifth post-war season of the highest tier of motorcycle speedway in Great Britain.

Summary
Bristol Bulldogs joined the league. Wembley Lions won the National League for the fifth time.

The Odsal Boomerangs became the Odsal Tudors during the season, the name change came at the end of July, possibly as a consequence of the events of 1 July. On 1 July 1950, 47-year-old Joe Abbott was killed instantly following a crash at Odsal Stadium in a league match against West Ham Hammers. After falling and hitting the safety fence he was hit by a rider behind. A second rider was killed on the same night in a division 2 fixture.

Final table

Top Ten Riders (League only)

National Trophy Stage Three
The 1950 National Trophy was the 13th edition of the Knockout Cup. The Trophy consisted of three stages; stage one was for the third division clubs, stage two was for the second division clubs and stage three was for the top tier clubs. The winner of stage one would qualify for stage two and the winner of stage two would qualify for the third and final stage. Wimbledon Dons won the third and final stage and were therefore declared the 1950 National Trophy champions.

 For Stage One - see Stage One
 For Stage Two - see Stage Two

First round

Second round

Semifinals

Final

First leg

Second leg

Wimbledon were National Trophy Champions, winning on aggregate 119–97, the trophy was presented by Vera Lynn.

See also
 List of United Kingdom Speedway League Champions
 Knockout Cup (speedway)

References

Speedway National League
1950 in speedway
Speedway National League